Infectious Grooves is an American funk metal supergroup led by vocalist Mike Muir and initially a side project from his group Suicidal Tendencies. The current lineup also includes guitarists Dean Pleasants and Jim Martin; bassist Robert Trujillo; drummer Brooks Wackerman. To date, the project released four albums between 1991 and 2000.

Though Muir's sense of humor was often obvious with Suicidal Tendencies, Infectious Grooves often brought out a goofier type of humor, incorporating comedy skits involving an anthropomorphic reptile named Sarsippius.  A mascot costume of Sarsippius was later created and often appeared during the band's live performances.

The Infectious Grooves were on hiatus between the release of their fourth album, 2000's Mas Borracho and 2007, while the band's personnel were busy with other projects. According to Muir, Infectious Grooves had been working on new material.  In April 2008 the band began a one-month tour across Europe, featuring Stephen Bruner on bass, Eric Moore on drums, Dean Pleasants and Tim Stewart on guitars.

Most of the band's original lineup reunited for the Orion Music + More festival in June 2013, with ex-Faith No More guitarist Jim Martin filling in for Adam Siegel.

Band members

Line-ups

Unofficial members
Dave Kushner - guitar (on album #1)
Rocky George - guitar (on album #1)
Dave Dunn - keyboards (on album #1)
Jim Martin - live guitarist 2013

Discography

References

External links

550 Music artists
American funk metal musical groups
Heavy metal musical groups from California
Musical groups established in 1989